The Department of Immigration and Multicultural Affairs (also called DIMA) was an Australian government department that existed between March 1996 and November 2001. Its slogan was "Enriching Australia through migration."

Scope
Information about the department's functions and/or government funding allocation could be found in the Administrative Arrangements Orders, the annual Portfolio Budget Statements, in the Department's annual reports and on the Department's website.

According to the Administrative Arrangements Order (AAO) made on 11 March 1996, the Department dealt with:
Migration, including refugees
Citizenship
Ethnic affairs
Post-arrival arrangements for migrants, other than migrant child education
Multicultural affairs

Structure
The Department was an Australian Public Service department, staffed by officials who were responsible to the Minister for Immigration and Multicultural Affairs, Philip Ruddock. The Secretary of the Department was Helen Williams (until February 1998) and then Bill Farmer. In 2000, the Department had approximately 3600 staff.

References

Ministries established in 1996
Immigration and Multicultural Affairs
1996 establishments in Australia
2001 disestablishments in Australia